José Longo (born 24 May 1994) is a Guatemalan football player who plays for Liga Nacional club Xinabajul.

External links 
 

1994 births
Living people
Guatemalan footballers
Guatemala international footballers
Association football forwards
C.S.D. Municipal players